No Agreement is an album by Nigerian Afrobeat composer, bandleader, and multi-instrumentalist Fela Kuti, recorded in 1977 and originally released on the Nigerian Decca label.

Reception

AllMusic stated: "No Agreement follows the Afro-beat template to a masterful level: amazingly catchy guitar lines that replicate a bass guitar in their construction, a second guitarist to add some JB's funk power, driving horn section proclamations, intricate saxophone, trumpet and organ improv solos, and then Fela Anikulapo Kuti's wit and message for the people...  the solos are magically inspired and the rhythm section rolls on with the power of a steamroller". The Guardian called the title track "one of the greatest pieces of dance music ever recorded."

Track listing
All compositions by Fela Kuti 
 "No Agreement" – 15:35  
 "Dog Eat Dog" – 15:33

Personnel
Fela Kuti – tenor saxophone, alto saxophone, electric piano, vocals
Lester Bowie, Tunde Williams, Nwokoma Ukem – trumpet
Lekan Animashaun – baritone saxophone
Leke Benson, Okalve Ojeah, Clifford Itoje, Oghene Kologbo – guitar
Nweke Atifoh – bass guitar
Tony Allen – drums
Ayoola Abayomi – percussion
Babajide Olaleye – maracas
Oladeinde Koffi, Addo Nettey, Shina Abiodun – congas
Bimbo Adelanwa, Bola Olaniyi, Emaruagheru Osawe, Fehintola Kayode, Folake Oladeinde, Kewe Oghomienor, Ronke Edason, Shade Komolafe, Tejumade Adebiyi, Yemi Abegunde – chorus

References

Fela Kuti albums
1977 albums
Decca Records albums
Afrobeat albums